is a media franchise by Square Enix which includes a series of arcade digital collectible card games, a Nintendo 3DS game, a manga series, and an anime television series. Later, Animax Asia aired the anime series from April 19, 2017.

Plot
In 21st century Japan, vehicles with artificial intelligence for increased safety, known as A.I. Cars, have revolutionized the automotive industry. Special schools teaching children to drive A.I. Cars have been established. One day, Kakeru Todoroki, a fifth grader of Arcadia Academy, is summoned by the school principal and given an A.I. Car with which to save humanity. The car, however, is actually also a transforming robot known as Gyrozetter. When Xenon, an evil organization bent on world domination, wreak havoc across New Yokohama City, Kakeru must gather the other "chosen drivers" foretold on the artifact known as the "Rosettagraph", and stop Xenon's evil plans.

Characters

The main protagonist of the series, and the first of the six chosen drivers selected by Arcadia. A young carefree boy who was very polite, and never forgets to smile and bow at whoever he met, although he regularly displayed recklessness that almost got him into trouble. However, whenever he sees someone in danger, he would not think twice before rushing to help, but when his friends were in deep danger, or if they were hurt in front of him, Kakeru sets his outgoing personality aside and unleashes his repressed hatred at his enemies. He usually used the word depressingly as an adjective, much to Rinne's dismay. His Gyrozetter, Raibird, uses a short sword, called "Thunderclap Blade", to deliver strikes at his enemies, and usually uses attacks based on Japanese wrestling moves, such as Lightning Slash, an diving attack. He has three Final Burst in the series

Media

Video games

The initial entry in the franchise was a 2012 arcade game, Chō Soku Henkei Gyrozetter, which incorporates a physical collectible card game. The game has two modes, car racing and robot battling. The arcade machine features a transforming input, which switches between a steering wheel for vehicle mode and a joystick for the robot battle mode.

In 2013, a Nintendo 3DS port called  was released.

Manga
A manga adaptation of the series, written and illustrated by Teruaki Mizuno, was serialized in Shueisha's Saikyō Jump manga magazine from October 2012 to April 2014.

Anime
A total of three theme songs are used, one opening and two endings. The opening is Let's Go! by Masahiko Kondō, the first ending is Strobe and the second ending, used from episode 18, is One Step, both by TEMPURA KIDZ. The series started on 2 October 2012 and ended on 24 September 2013.

Episode list

References

External links
 

2012 anime television series debuts
A-1 Pictures
Action anime and manga
Card games in anime and manga
Japanese children's animated action television series
Manga based on video games
Mecha anime and manga
Shōnen manga
Shueisha manga
Square Enix games
TV Tokyo original programming
Unreal Engine games